Misvær Church is a parish church of the Church of Norway in Bodø Municipality in Nordland county, Norway. It is located in the village of Misvær in the southern part of the municipality (in what used to be the municipality of Skjerstad).  It is one of two churches for the Misvær og Skjerstad parish which is part of the Bodø domprosti (deanery) in the Diocese of Sør-Hålogaland. The white, wooden church was built in a long church style in 1912 using plans drawn up by the architect O.M. Olsen. The church seats about 200 people.

History
There was a medieval church located in Misvær on the same site. It was a small chapel that was used for church services mostly in the winters when the local residents couldn't travel to the larger Skjerstad Church when the Misværfjord was frozen. The church existed until 1720 when it was torn down and not replaced. In 1912, the new, present church was completed on the same site to serve the growing population in Misvær. The new building was consecrated on 31 October 1912.

Media gallery

See also
List of churches in Sør-Hålogaland

References

Churches in Bodø
Churches in Nordland
Wooden churches in Norway
20th-century Church of Norway church buildings
Churches completed in 1912
1912 establishments in Norway
Long churches in Norway